WebAIM (Web Accessibility in Mind) is a non-profit organization based at Utah State University in Logan, Utah. WebAIM has provided web accessibility solutions since 1999. WebAIM's mission is to expand the potential of the web for people with disabilities by providing the knowledge, technical skills, tools, organizational leadership strategies, and vision that empower organizations to make their own content accessible to people with disabilities.

Products and services
WebAIM provides a number of web accessibility products and services. The WAVE accessibility evaluation tool is administered by WebAIM. This free, online tool provides visual feedback of a page's accessibility. The WAVE Toolbar is also available as an extension for both Firefox & Chrome browsers. 

WebAIM web accessibility services include accessibility training, web site monitoring & reporting, certification, consulting, accessible site design, and accessibility repairs.

Community
WebAIM administers an online community that focuses on web accessibility. Community resources include a newsletter, blog, email discussion list, an onsite 2-day training,  and RSS feeds.

Resources
The WebAIM web site provides extensive information for web developers, webmasters, and others interested in accessibility of web content for the following disabilities:
 visual disabilities - blindness, low vision, and color blindness
 motor disabilities - including Parkinson's disease, paraplegia, muscular dystrophy, cerebral palsy, arthritis, stroke, etc.
 cognitive disabilities - including dementia, dyslexia, autism, Down Syndrome, traumatic brain injury, attention deficit disorder, or other functional disabilities that may impact ones ability in memory, problem-solving, attention, and reading, math, or visual comprehension.
 deafness and hearing impairments.

See also
 Digital Accessibility Technologist

WebAIM Articles address a range of web accessibility topics, including:
 Introduction to Web Accessibility
 How individuals with disabilities access and use the web
 Assistive technology
 Adobe Flash
 HTML
 Forms
 Frames
 JavaScript
 AJAX
 Cascading Style Sheets
 Tables
 Rich Media
 Adobe Acrobat
 Closed captioning
 Adobe Flash
 Microsoft Word and PowerPoint
 Evaluation, Testing, and Tools
 Standards and Laws
 W3C's Web Content Accessibility Guidelines
 Section 508
 International laws
 Policy, Coordination, and Training

References

External links
 WAVE Accessibility Evaluation Tool
 WAVE Toolbar Extension

Utah State University
1999 establishments in Utah
Web accessibility
Organizations established in 1999